Liana M. Cassar is an American politician and a Democratic member of the Rhode Island House of Representatives, representing District 66 since January 1, 2019.

Early life and education
Cassar was born and raised in Connecticut, and graduated from John Jay High School in Katonah, New York. Following this, she graduated with a Bachelor of Arts degree from the University of Connecticut and served as a Community Development Worker in the Peace Corps in Costa Rica from 1992 to 1995. She also completed her MPH at Boston University and MBA from Simmons College.

Career
Cassar has worked in various health care and public health sectors in Rhode Island and Massachusetts. She has served as co-chair of the Barrington Democratic Town Committee and as an Advisory Board Member for the Center for Health and Justice Transformation. Earlier, she was a strategy and Operations Consultant to Big Brothers Big Sisters of Rhode Island and served as a strategic business consultant for AthenaHealth. From 2006 until 2008, Cassar served as the Chief Operating Officer for Planned Parenthood of Rhode Island.

In January 2018, Cassar announced her bid to replace Joy Hearn as a member of the Rhode Island House of Representatives representing District 66. She defeated John Chung in the primary and Republican Rhonda Holmes in November's general election to win her first election. Prior to the COVID-19 pandemic in North America, Cassar announced legislation to lift the ban on abortion coverage for state employee health plans and ensure that abortion care is covered by Medicaid. Following this, she was appointed to the Health, Education and Welfare Committee while continuing to work with the House Committee on Small Business. In October, Cassar announced her bid for Rhode Island House Speaker against Nicholas Mattiello. She eventually dropped her bid in December after the majority of the House voted for Joe Shekarchi.

References

External links

Living people
University of Connecticut alumni
Boston University alumni
Democratic Party members of the Rhode Island House of Representatives
Women state legislators in Rhode Island
21st-century American politicians
21st-century American women politicians
Year of birth missing (living people)